Violation is the second studio album by the late-1970s American hard rock band Starz, released in 1977.

Track listing

Personnel
Starz
Michael Lee Smith – vocals
Richie Ranno – guitar
Brendan Harkin – guitar
Pieter "Pete" Sweval – bass
Joe X. Dube – drums

Production
Jack Douglas – producer
Jay Messina – engineer
Sam Ginsberg, Dave Martone – assistant engineers

References

1977 albums
Capitol Records albums
Albums produced by Jack Douglas (record producer)
Starz (band) albums